Gregory Earl Boyd (born September 15, 1952) is a former American football defensive lineman who played nine seasons in the National Football League and one in the United States Football League.  He has a Super Bowl ring from the 1984 San Francisco 49ers.

References

1952 births
Living people
People from Merced, California
American football defensive ends
San Diego State Aztecs football players
New England Patriots players
Denver Broncos players
Green Bay Packers players
San Francisco 49ers players
Los Angeles Raiders players
Fresno City Rams football players
Players of American football from California